Luiz Otávio da Silva Santos (born 9 October 1992), known as Luiz Otávio, is a Brazilian footballer who plays as a central defender for Bahia.

Club career
Born in Japeri, Rio de Janeiro, Luiz Otávio started his career in Fluminense's youth categories, but was released after only three months at the club. In 2010, aged 17, he moved to Fortaleza and joined Ferroviário-CE, but never played for the club.

Luiz Otávio subsequently represented São Cristóvão and Bangu, making his senior debut with the latter as a forward on 22 September 2012 by coming on as a substitute and scoring the equalizer in a 1–1 Copa Rio away draw against Boavista. Back to his preferred position, he was subsequently loaned to Bonsucesso in 2013, achieving promotion from the Campeonato Carioca Série B.

On 12 February 2015, after leaving Bangu through a court dispute, Luiz Otávio signed for Série B side Luverdense. He made his debut in the category on 11 July, starting in a 0–0 away draw against CRB.

Luiz Otávio scored his first goal in the second tier on 24 October 2015, netting his team's first in a 3–2 loss at Bragantino. An undisputed starter during the following years, he moved to Chapecoense on a one-year loan deal on 5 January 2017.

On 4 April 2017, Luiz Otávio scored the winning goal of the first leg of the Recopa Sudamericana finals, giving his side a 2–1 lead.

Career statistics

Honours
Luverdense
Campeonato Matogrossense: 2016

Chapecoense
 Campeonato Catarinense: 2017, 2020
 Campeonato Brasileiro Série B: 2020

Bahia
 Copa do Nordeste: 2021

References

External links

1992 births
Living people
Brazilian footballers
Sportspeople from Rio de Janeiro (state)
Association football defenders
Campeonato Brasileiro Série A players
Campeonato Brasileiro Série B players
Bangu Atlético Clube players
Bonsucesso Futebol Clube players
Luverdense Esporte Clube players
Associação Chapecoense de Futebol players
Botafogo Futebol Clube (SP) players
Mirassol Futebol Clube players
Esporte Clube Bahia players